Judy Lee (born March 7, 1942) is an American politician. She is a member of the North Dakota State Senate from the 13th District, serving since 1994. Senator Lee is Chair of the Human Services Committee, a standing member of the Political Subdivisions Committee, a procedural member of the Rules Committee, and an interim member of the Legislative Audit and Fiscal Review Committee. She served as the President Pro Tempore of the North Dakota State Senate during the 60th Legislative Assembly in 2007. She is a member of the Republican party. Since 2015, American Conservative Union had ranked Lee as the most moderate Republican in the North Dakota State Senate.

Senator Lee has a Bachelor of Science in Medical Technology and a Masters in Public Health, both from the University of North Dakota.

References

Living people
1942 births
Presidents pro tempore of the North Dakota Senate
Republican Party North Dakota state senators
21st-century American politicians
Women state legislators in North Dakota
University of North Dakota alumni
21st-century American women politicians